Thyatira staphyla is a moth in the family Drepanidae. It was described by Paul Dognin in 1890. It is found in Loja Province, Ecuador.

References

Moths described in 1890
Thyatirinae